The following is a timeline of the history of the city of Muscat, Oman.

Prior to 20th century

 550 BCE - Achaemenids in power (approximate date).
 100s CE - Migration of Arab tribes from Yemen.
300s CE - Arab tribes expelled the Sassanians.
 633 CE - Regional Islamization.
696 CE - Umayyad army attempting to seize Muscat was defeated.
865 CE - Flood destroy a portion of the city.
 1507 - City taken by Portuguese forces under command of Afonso de Albuquerque.
 1522 - Uprising against Portuguese rule.
 1546 - City bombarded by Ottoman ships without landing.
 1552 - Capture of Muscat (1552) by Ottoman forces under Piri Reis for a brief period.
 1581 - City pillaged by Ottomans under command of Piri Reis before withdrawing.
 1586-1588 - Fort al-Jalali and Fort al-Mirani completed.
 1624 - Construction begins of "earthen land wall" around city.
 1640 - City attacked by forces of Nasir bin Murshid.
 1648 - City besieged by Nasir ibn Murshid but Portuguese sued for peace.
 1650 - City taken by forces of Sultan bin Saif; Portuguese ousted.
 1670 - Dutch East India Company factory established.
 1738 - Muscat occupied by forces of Muhammad Taqi Khan of Fars.
 1740s - Ahmad bin Said al-Busaidi in power.
 1792 - Albusaidi monarch Hamad ibn Said relocates the capital of Oman from Rustaq to Muscat.
 1800 - British representative of the British East India Company takes residence in Muscat.
 1806 - Said bin Sultan in power.
 1832 - Capital of the Omani empire relocated from Muscat to colonial Zanzibar by Said bin Sultan.
 1845 - Bait al-Falaj Fort built.
 1856 - Thuwaini bin Said becomes sultan of the newly formed Sultanate of Muscat and Oman and his capital is Muscat.
1879 - The United States consulate is established in Muscat.
 1890 - Cyclonic storm flooding kills 700 people.
 1893 - Hospital established.
 1894 - French consulate established.
 1899 - Bubonic plague strikes at Muscat.

20th century

 1928 - Al-Sa'idiyah School established.
 1929 - Vehicular road into city built "by the hacking out of a one-lane track through the mountains."
 1932 - Said bin Taimur becomes sultan.
 1939 - Municipal council established.
 1943 - Bombing of ship in harbor by Japanese forces.
 1948 - British Bank of the Middle East branch in business.
 1949 - Municipal Law for the Sultanate of Muscat and Oman issued.
 1951 - Indian consulate established.
 1952 - Population: 4,200 in town (approximate estimate).
 1960 - Population: 5,080 in town; 6,208 urban agglomeration (approximate estimate).
 1962 - Muttrah-Muscat road paved.
 1963 - Slavery abolished.

 1967 - Petroleum Development Oman headquartered in Muscat.
 1968 - Electric power plant commissioned in Riyam.
 1970 - Qaboos bin Said al Said in power.
 1972
 June: Muttrah and Muscat merge to form the Muscat Municipality.
 Al Alam Palace built.
 1973
 Seeb Airport opens.
 British School – Muscat established.
 1974
 Port Sultan Qaboos built in Muttrah.
 Museum of Omani Heritage opens.
 1975
 Office of municipality president established.
 Times of Oman newspaper begins publication.
 1981
 Oman Daily Observer newspaper begins publication.
 Ministry of Social Affairs and Labor and Ministry of Petroleum built.
 1984 - Muscat Governorate established.
 1985
 Gulf Cooperation Council meets in Muscat.
 Al-Bustan Palace Hotel in business.
 Oman Natural History Museum opens.
 1986 - Sultan Qaboos University opens.
 1987 - Royal Hospital built.
 1988
 Muscat Securities Market established.
 Alwatan newspaper in publication.
 French embassy built.
 1990 - Oman Children's Museum established.
 1992 - Omani French Museum established.
 1993
 40,856 in city.
 Dam and Oman International Bank built.
 Oman Society for Fine Arts established.
 1995 - Oman Oil and Gas Exhibition Centre established.
 1996 - National Hospitality Institute headquartered in city.
 1998 - Bait al Zubair museum opens.

21st century

 2001
 Sultan Qaboos Grand Mosque built.
 Muscat Gate Museum opens.
 Population: 685,676 in governorate.
 2006 - Bait Al Baranda (house museum) opened.
 2010 - Al-Musannah Sports City opened.
 2011

 Royal Opera House Muscat opened in Shati Al-Qurm.
 2012 - Muscat Expressway built.
 2013 - Fish souk rebuilt.
 2018
 EDM producer Avicii died by suicide in Muscat.
 Population: 315,443 (estimate).
 2020
 in January 2020, Haitham bin Tariq Al Said became the new successor of Oman after the sad demise of the then His Majesty Sultan Qaboos.
NOC (No Objection Certificate) abolished amidst COVID-19.

See also
 Muscat history
 List of cities in Oman (also by population, in German)
 Old Muscat

References

Bibliography

Published in 18th-19th centuries
 
 
 
 
 
 

Published in 20th century
 
 
 
 
 
 

Published in 21st century

External links

 Map of Muscat, 1985
 
 Europeana. Items related to Muscat, various dates.

 
Muscat
 
Years in Oman
Muscat, Oman